Alana, Alanna, or Alannah is a female given name. It can be derived either from the Old High German word for "precious" or from the Irish language term "a leanbh" for "child".

Alana is also a unisex given name in the Hawaiian community meaning fair, beautiful, offering, “harmony”. In Aramaic, Alanna means "high", "elevated" or "exalted".

People with the given name Alana/Alaina/Alanna/Alannah/Alanah 
 Alaina Lockhart (born 1974), Canadian politician
 Alana Blanchard, American professional surfer and model
 Alana Boden, English actress
 Alana Bridgewater, Canadian singer and actor from the Canadian production of the musical We Will Rock You
 Alana Evans, American pornographic actress
 Alana Haim, American musician and member of the band Haim
 Alana Henderson, Northern Irish singer-songwriter and cellist
 Alana Mann, food activist
 Alana Paon, Canadian politician
 Alana Patience, Australian ballroom dancer and two times winner of Dancing with the Stars
 Alana Shipp, American/Israeli IFBB professional bodybuilder
 Alana Thompson, American child star of the TLC reality TV series Here Comes Honey Boo Boo
 Alanah Pearce, Australian video game writer
 Alanah Woody, American archeologist and anthropologist
 Alanna Knight (1923–2020), British writer
 Alanna Kraus, Canadian skater
 Alanna Goldie (born 1994), Canadian fencer
 Alanna Heiss, American pioneer of alternative exhibition space
 Alanna Masterson, American actress best known for portraying Tara Chambler on The Walking Dead TV series
 Alanna Nash, American journalist and biographer
 Alanna Nihell (born 1985), Irish boxer
 Alanna Nobbs, Australian historian and current President of the Society for the Study of Early Christianity
 Alanna Rizzo, American sports reporter
 Alanna Schepartz, American scientist
 Alanna Ubach, American actress
 Alannah Currie, New Zealand musician from the Thompson Twins
 Alannah Hill, Australian fashion designer
 Alannah MacTiernan, Australian politician
 Alannah Mikac, Australian girl whose death in the Port Arthur massacre inspired the founding of The Alannah and Madeline Foundation
 Alannah Myles, Canadian singer-songwriter

People with given name Alena/Alenah
 Alena Šeredová, Czech model
 Alena Vránová, Czech actress
 Alena Vrzáňová, Czech sportswoman and figure skater

Fictional characters
 Alana, a female Transformer from Transformers: Generation 1
Alana Beck, from Dear Evan Hansen
 Alanna Mosvani, in Robert Jordan's Wheel of Time series
 Alanna of Trebond, in Tamora Pierce's Tortall novels, beginning with Alanna: The First Adventure
 Alana Reeves, the main character in the novel Forget Me Not by Elizabeth Lowell
 Alana, in the 1990s Australian TV series The Girl from Tomorrow
 Alana, one of Ariel’s sisters in The Little Mermaid franchise
 Alana Bloom, in the TV series Hannibal
 Alana from the Saga comic book series
 Alanna, an inhabitant of the planet Rann in American comic books published by DC Comics
 Alana Fitzgerald, a character in the Family Guy episode, All About Alana.

See also
  or Alanah
  or Alannah

Feminine given names
English feminine given names

cs:Alena